The SNCF 4-240A class and SNCF 5-240P class was a group of 37 (12 + 25) 4-8-0 steam locomotives designed by André Chapelon, and regarded by some, as one of his best designs.

They started life as Chemin de Fer de Paris à Orléans (Paris-Orleans Railway) 4500 class 4-6-2s before being rebuilt. The new boiler with the long, narrow Belpaire firebox came from the Nord "Super Pacifics". With all the pipes, domes, and pumps, these were double-chimneyed, husky looking locomotives of very different appearance than the Pacifics.

Use

4-240A 
SNCF south-west.

These 12 4-8-0s were created to tackle the 1:100 gradients of the Brive to Montauban division of the line from Paris to Toulouse, steeper than those to Bordeaux. The intention was to provide one-third more adhesive weight than the 4500s.

5-240P 

SNCF south-east.

These 25 4-8-0s were created by 1940 to tackle the 1:125 gradient of the Les Laumes to Dijon division of the line from Paris to Lyon. Used in passenger and fast freight services between Paris and Lyon. Withdrawn by 1950 with the electrification of the Paris - Dijon section. These later locomotives had mechanical stokers and bogie tenders.

References

Railway locomotives introduced in 1940
2′D h4v locomotives
4-8-0 locomotives
240P
240P
Compagnie du chemin de fer de Paris à Orléans locomotives
Standard gauge locomotives of France
Scrapped locomotives